The year 604 BC was a year of the pre-Julian Roman calendar. In the Roman Empire, it was known as year 150 Ab urbe condita. The denomination 604 BC for this year has been used since the early medieval period, when the Anno Domini calendar era became the prevalent method in Europe for naming years.

Events

Deaths
Duke Gong of Qin, ruler of the Chinese state of Qin

References